Slovenia competed at the 2022 World Athletics Championships in Eugene, United States, from 15 to 24 July 2022. The country was represented by 10 athletes, seven women and three men.

Medallists

Results

Men 
Track and road events

Field events

Women 
Track and road events

Field events

References

External links
Oregon22｜WCH 22｜World Athletics

Nations at the 2022 World Athletics Championships
World Championships in Athletics
Slovenia at the World Championships in Athletics